Roger Federer won his first Major title at Wimbledon, when he defeated Mark Philippoussis in the final, 7–6(7–5), 6–2, 7–6(7–3). Federer won his first and only doubles Masters Series 1000 Event in Miami with Max Mirnyi, and made it to one singles Masters Series 1000 final in Rome on clay, which he lost. Federer made it to nine finals on the ATP Tour, of which he won seven, including the 500 series events at Dubai and Vienna. Lastly, Federer won the Year-End Championships over Andre Agassi.

Year summary

Early hard court season
Federer began the 2003 season as the world number 6, with the stated goal of capturing his first career Grand Slam title. However, early loses in Doha to Jan-Michael Gambill and as defending champion in Sydney to Franco Squillari kicked off the year in an ominous fashion.

In the first Grand Slam tournament of the year, Federer entered as the sixth seed and had a good chance to win his first Grand Slam when his draw opened up with the quick elimination of major rivals Marat Safin and Lleyton Hewitt. Federer entered the round of 16 without having dropped a set and faced his early nemesis David Nalbandian of Argentina. The match was a back-and-forth struggle, however, Federer ended up losing the five set match 4–6, 6–3, 1–6, 6–1, 3–6.

He then won two hard-court tournaments in Marseille and Dubai, defeating Jonas Björkman and Jiří Novák respectively. These two tournament victories constituted his fifth and sixth career singles titles. Back in the United States Federer had disappointing results at the Masters Series tournaments in Indian Wells and Key Biscayne. He was upset in early-round matches by a pair of former French Open champions, Gustavo Kuerten and Albert Costa.

Clay court season
On clay, Federer won the tournament in Munich defeating Finn Jarkko Nieminen 6–1, 6–4. This was his seventh career title and second career clay court title. Following this victory, Federer began his preparation for the French Open by competing in the clay masters tournaments in Rome and Hamburg. He reached the finals of Rome dropping only a single set, but was upset in a shocking defeat to the unseeded Spaniard Felix Mantilla 5–7, 2–6, 6–7(8). In Hamburg, the final tuneup before the French Open, Federer was defeated in the third round by Australian Mark Philippoussis 3–6, 6–2, 3–6.

His victory in Munich and finals showing in Rome launched Federer into the conversation as a favorite to win the French. Federer, seeded number five, was determined to prove himself at the French Open in 2003 after losing in the first round the year before. His opponent in the first round was Luis Horna of Peru who ranked number 88 in the world. Federer started out well, jumping out to a 5–3 lead in the first set before imploding and losing the match 6–7(6), 2–6, 6–7(3). After the nightmarish match where Federer committed an astounding 82 unforced errors he stated, "I don't know how long I'll need to get over this defeat. A day, a week, a year—or my entire career."

Grass court season
Two weeks after his crushing defeat in the first round of the French Open, Federer began the grass court season. He competed in the Gerry Weber Open in Halle, Germany. Federer quickly wiped away the bitter defeat in France by reaching the finals and defeating German Nicolas Kiefer 6–1, 6–3. This was Federer's first title on grass and it propelled him to odds of 5:1 to win Wimbledon at the British betting offices—behind only Americans Andre Agassi and Andy Roddick. 
 
Federer entered Wimbledon as the fourth seed and quickly raced through the first three rounds. In the fourth round he faced Feliciano López and was victorious in straight sets even though he had to take numerous injury timeouts for a serious lower back injury sustained in the match warm-up. In the quarterfinals Federer was fortunate that the match was delayed because of rain and was able to rest his injury for two whole days. When the quarterfinals finally began Federer defeated the eighth seed Sjeng Schalken of the Netherlands. His next match was a blockbuster semifinal where he faced American favorite Andy Roddick. Roddick had won the other grass court tuneup at the Queen's Club Championships and was an extremely dangerous opponent on grass. Federer defeated his young American rival 7–6(6), 6–3, 6–3 and became the first Swiss man to advance to the finals of a Grand Slam tournament. In the finals Federer faced Australian Philippoussis who had defeated him earlier in the year at Hamburg. Federer, however, proved that he possessed the quality of a champion and rose to the occasion. As Philippoussis's backhand sailed into the net on championship point Federer sank to his knees, raised his arms above his head, and looked to the sky. He had defeated the Australian 7–6(5), 6–2, 7–6(3) and finally achieved his elusive first Grand Slam title.

His breakthrough and victory and the 2003 Wimbledon Championships proved especially significant because Federer would go on to win more Grand Slam and Wimbledon  titles than any man in tennis history. This achievement of winning his first ever Wimbledon and Grand Slam title has been repeatedly described by the Swiss star as the highlight of his career along with his 2009 victory at Roland Garros.

Gstaad
Immediately following his historic Wimbledon victory, Federer flew to the Bernese Alps to honor his commitment of playing the Swiss Open in Gstaad. This tournament was unique in Federer's calendar as it was played on a clay surface in between the grass and summer hard court seasons. Federer's Wimbledon victory was honored by the tournament which gave the Swiss star a 1,760 pound milking cow named Juliette. Federer continued his winning ways until exhaustion finally caught up to him in the finals, where he fell to Jiri Novak in five sets ending his 15 match winning streak. This loss, however, could not lessen the euphoric atmosphere in Switzerland in the wake of his Wimbledon performance.

Summer hard court season
During the North American summer hard-court season, however, Federer lost his initial opportunities to ascend to the top of the world rankings. Federer lost an extremely close match in the semifinals of the Masters Series tournament in Montreal to Roddick which ended in a final-set tiebreaker 4–6, 6–3, 6–7(3). This would be the last time he would lose to Roddick until 2008. At the Cincinnati Masters Federer lost to rival David Nalbandian in the second round. This loss to Nalbandian was extremely close as well with Federer on the unlucky end of a 6–7(4), 6–7(5) result.

Federer entered the 2003 US Open for the first time ever as a Grand Slam champion. The number two seed breezed through the first three rounds of the tournament dropping only his opening set. In the fourth round Federer again faced nemesis Nalbandian who had defeated him in the previous tournament and held a 4–0 head-to-head record against the Swiss. The Argentine again frustrated Federer as the Swiss lost 6–3, 6–7, 4–6, 3–6. His goal of achieving the number one ranking receded even further as Roddick completed the American summer hard court triple.

Fall indoor season
During the autumn, Federer played four consecutive indoor tournaments in Europe. He won the tournament in Vienna defeating former world number one and French Open champion Carlos Moyá 6–3, 6–3, 6–3. However, he failed to reach the finals in his home tournament of Basel and the Masters Series tournaments in Madrid and Paris.

To end the year, Federer won his first Tennis Masters Cup title in Houston. As the third-seeded player, he defeated Andre Agassi to open the round robin in a thrilling 6–7(2), 6–3, 7–6(7) epic. He would go on to win in straight sets against Nalbandian, 6–3, 6–0, defeating the Argentine for the first time in his career. His last round robin match was against world number 2 Juan Carlos Ferrero who fell to Federer 6–3, 6–1. In the semifinals he defeated world number 1 and US Open champion Andy Roddick 7–6, 6–2. Federer entered the final against the 1990 champion Andre Agassi and won decisively 6–3, 6–0, 6–4.

Federer challenged for the top ranking during 2003, finishing the year at world number 2, just behind Roddick and just ahead of Juan Carlos Ferrero.

Matches

Grand Slam performance

All matches

Singles

Yearly records

Finals

Singles: 9 (7–2)

Prize money earnings

See also
Roger Federer
Roger Federer career statistics

References

External links
  
 ATP tour profile

2003
Federer season
2003 in Swiss tennis
2003 in Swiss sport